

Tidhelm (died ) was a medieval Bishop of Hereford. He was consecrated between 930 and 931 and died in either 934 or between 937 and 940.

Citations

References

External links
 

Bishops of Hereford
10th-century English bishops
937 deaths